Arthur Lewis may refer to:
Arthur Lewis (athlete) (born 1972), American Paralympic athlete 
Arthur Lewis (English cricketer) (1901–1980), English cricketer
Arthur Lewis (Australian cricketer) (1830–1907), Australian cricketer
Arthur Lewis (Australian politician) (1882–1975), member of the Australian Parliament
Arthur Lewis (British politician) (1917–1998), English Labour MP for Newham North West
Arthur Lewis (rugby union) (born 1941), former Wales and British Lions international rugby union player
Arthur Lewis (photographer) (1885–1952), Welsh photographer
Arthur Bernard Lewis (1926–2010), American television writer and producer
Arthur John Lewis (1879–1961), member of the Canadian House of Commons
Arthur Lewis (art director)
Arthur Joseph Lewis, Jr.,  Massachusetts politician
W. Arthur Lewis (1915–1991), winner of the 1979 Nobel Prize in Economics
Art Lewis (1911–1962), American football player and coach
Arthur Lewis, a character in the film Beethoven's 2nd

See also
Arthur Louis (1950–2014), musician whose surname is pronounced luːɪs (Lewis)